Myristica psilocarpa is a species of plant in the Myristicaceae. It is endemic to Manus Island, Papua New Guinea. The conservation status of this plant is listed as vulnerable on the IUCN Red List. The plant grows in lowland rainforest.

References

Endemic flora of Papua New Guinea
psilocarpa
Vulnerable plants
Taxonomy articles created by Polbot